Par la Fenetre is a 1948 French comedy film starring Bourvil. It was a sizeable box office hit.

It was shot at the Saint-Maurice Studios in Paris.

Plot
A man goes to Paris and finds work as a painter.

Reception
The film was the fifteenth most popular movie at the French box office in 1948. It ranked after The Charterhouse of Parma, Operation Swallow: The Battle for Heavy Water, Clochemerle, To the Eyes of Memory, Les Casse Pieds, Les Aventures des Pieds-Nickelés, Forever Amber, Blanc comme neige, Notorious, Ali Baba and the 40 Thieves, Man to Men, The Ironmaster, How I Lost the War and The Bandit of Sherwood Forest.

References

External links

1948 films
French comedy films
Films directed by Gilles Grangier
1948 comedy films
1940s French-language films
Films set in Paris
French black-and-white films
1940s French films